

Rachel Carson Bridge, also known as the Ninth Street Bridge, spans the Allegheny River in Downtown Pittsburgh, Pennsylvania in the United States. The total length is  including the  main span and two  side spans, or  including the approaches. Whereas the roadway formerly carried two vehicle lanes and two streetcar tracks, it was changed to carry four wide vehicle lanes. The 2019-2020 refurbishment reduced the lanes to three.

Named for the naturalist and author Rachel Carson, a Pittsburgh native, it is one of three parallel bridges called the Three Sisters, the others being the Roberto Clemente Bridge and the Andy Warhol Bridge. The Three Sisters are self-anchored suspension bridges and are significant because they are the only trio of nearly identical bridges—as well as the first self-anchored suspension spans—built in the United States.

History
The bridge was dedicated and opened at a noon ceremony with Commissioner Babcock, Mayor Kline, and city council members including Herron and McArdle.  The cost of construction was $1.46 million or $ in  terms.

The bridge was renamed on Earth Day, April 22, 2006, after years of lobbying by Esther Barazzone, president of Chatham University, the alma mater of the renowned environmentalist. Carson was born in 1907 in Springdale, Pennsylvania, in a farmhouse  up the Allegheny River, now the Rachel Carson Homestead.

On February 11, 2019 the bridge was closed to vehicles and pedestrians for a comprehensive rehabilitation project. The bridge was expected to remain closed until at least June 2020. Traffic was detoured over either the Andy Warhol Bridge or the Roberto Clemente Bridge, both of which run parallel and are less than 1/2 mile away from the Rachel Carson Bridge.

The bridge reopened in November 2020 after the completion of a $23.3 million rehabilitation project. It was reconfigured from four lanes to three with the direction of the middle lane depending on time of day.

Image gallery

See also
List of bridges documented by the Historic American Engineering Record in Pennsylvania
List of crossings of the Allegheny River

References

External links

entry at pghbridges.com
entry at BridgeMeister.com

Carson
Bridges completed in 1926
Bridges over the Allegheny River
Road bridges on the National Register of Historic Places in Pennsylvania
Bridge
Pittsburgh History & Landmarks Foundation Historic Landmarks
Suspension bridges in Pennsylvania
Self-anchored suspension bridges
Historic American Engineering Record in Pennsylvania
1926 establishments in Pennsylvania
National Register of Historic Places in Pittsburgh